Andrea La Torre (born June 14, 1997) is an Italian professional basketball player for Pallacanestro Cantù of the Italian Lega Basket Serie A (LBA).

Professional career
On July 6, 2015, La Torre signed with Olimpia Milano. On July 17, 2015, La Torre was sent on loan to Angelico Biella.

On November 8, 2018, La Torre signed a three-year deal with Pallacanestro Cantù. The team announced he would play a third season on June 16, 2020.

National team career
La Torre was a member of the Under-16, Under-18, and Under-19 Italian national junior basketball teams.

References

1997 births
Living people
A.S. Stella Azzurra players
Italian men's basketball players
Lega Basket Serie A players
Olimpia Milano players
Pallacanestro Biella players
Pallacanestro Cantù players
Power forwards (basketball)
Small forwards
Veroli Basket players